Anders Remmer is a Danish electronic musician, producer and film composer. He was born and raised in Denmark.

Now he is one of the key figures in the electronic community of Copenhagen. Working together with Thomas Knak a.k.a. Opiate and Jesper Skaaning a.k.a. Acustic, he recorded a set of influential albums and singles under the "Future 3" and "System" monikers.

He is a member of several bands:
System with Thomas Knak and Jesper Skaaning
How Do I with Double Muffled Dolphin
Jesper & Anders a.k.a.  Recycler 202 with Jesper Skaaning
People Press Play with Thomas Knak, Jesper Skaaning and Sara Savery

Discography

Singles 
as Jet
 Jet #1 (12") - (April Records, 1997)
 Jet #2 (12") - (April Records, 1997)
 OK (2xLP) - (April Records, 1998)

as Dub Tractor
 Overheated Livingroom EP (12″) - (FLEX Records, 1996)
 Scary H H Loop / 104 Dub (12") - (Additive Records, 1997)
 Tractor Beam EP (12") - (FX Records, 1997)
 Tractor Pull EP (12") - (FX Records, 1998)
 Spring Reverb EP (12") - (FLEX Records, 1999)
 Opiate / Dub Tractor Split (LP) - (City Centre Offices, 2001)
 Hum EP (12", EP) - (Hobby Industries, 2002)
 Promoblock 001 (7", Promo, Smplr) - (City Centre Offices, 2003)
 Faster EP (12", EP) - (City Centre Offices, 2004)

Albums 
as Jet
 CPH 2000 - (April Records, 1997)
 OK - (April Records, 1998)

as Dub Tractor
 Discrete Recordings - (FLEX Records, 1994)
 An Evening with... - (FLEX Records/Additive Records, 1996)
 Delay - (FX Records, 2000)
 More or Less Mono - (City Centre Offices, 2003)
 Hideout - (City Centre Offices, 2006)
 Sorry (CD/LP) - (City Centre Offices, 2009)

External links

Anders Remmer at Discogs

Danish electronic musicians
Year of birth missing (living people)
Living people